Robert Paul Sandall (9 June 1952 – 20 July 2010) was a British musician, music journalist and radio presenter. He was best known as co-presenter of BBC Radio 3's Mixing It and Late Junction programmes.

Life
Sandall was born on 9 June 1952 in Pinner, Middlesex. In the late 1970s he was a singer and guitarist in London-based punk band Blunt Instrument, later known as London Zoo.

He wrote for Q, Rolling Stone, The Word and GQ magazines. After a brief period at The Daily Telegraph, in 1988 he became the rock critic for The Sunday Times.

From 1990 until 2007 he presented, with Mark Russell, BBC Radio 3's Mixing It programme. After ending on Radio 3 the show moved to Resonance FM in London, where it continued for a further two years under the name Where's the Skill in That?. Sandall also presented of the BBC's Late Junction, and contributed to BBC Radio 4's Front Row. He also worked at VH-1 UK on the Take It To The Bridge show in 1995 co-presenting with Pip Dann.

From 1996 to 2002 he was director of communications at Virgin Records.

Personal life
Sandall was married to Anita Mackie. The couple had one daughter, Grace. He died after a long battle with prostate cancer.

References

External links
Articles at Rockpages 
Obituary: The Arts Desk 
Obituary: The Daily Telegraph
Obituary: Music Week

1952 births
2010 deaths
People educated at Haberdashers' Boys' School
Alumni of Lincoln College, Oxford
British music history
British radio DJs
Deaths from prostate cancer
English radio personalities
People from Pinner
BBC Radio 3 presenters